The Swon Brothers is the major label debut studio album by American country music duo The Swon Brothers. It was released on October 14, 2014, via Arista Nashville. It includes the top 15 single "Later On". The Swon Brothers produced the album with Mark Bright.

Track listing

Personnel

The Swon Brothers
 Colton Swon - vocals
 Zach Swon - vocals, keyboards, programming

Additional Musicians
 Eric Darken - percussion
 Dan Dugmore - steel guitar
 Shannon Forrest - drums
 Eric Gillette - electric guitar
 Kenny Greenberg - electric guitar
 Joe Henderson - keyboards, programming
 Mark Hill - bass guitar
 Greg Morrow - drums
 Jimmy Nichols - keyboards, synthesizer strings
 Chris Stevens - programming
 Ilya Toshinsky - acoustic guitar, mandolin, banjo
 Carrie Underwood - background vocals on "This Side of Heaven"

Chart performance
The album debuted on the Billboard 200 at No. 28, and No. 6 on the Top Country Albums chart, with 10,000 copies sold on its debut week.  It sold a further 3,400 the next week.  The album has sold a total of 34,900 copies in the US as of March 2015.

Album

Singles

References

2014 albums
The Swon Brothers albums
Arista Records albums
Albums produced by Mark Bright (record producer)